Edward Albert Arthur Woodward, OBE (1 June 1930 – 16 November 2009) was an English actor and singer. After graduating from the Royal Academy of Dramatic Art, he began his career on stage. Throughout his career, he appeared in productions in both the West End of London and on Broadway in New York City. He came to wider attention from 1967 in the title role of the British television spy drama Callan, earning him the 1970 British Academy Television Award for Best Actor.

Woodward starred as Police Sergeant Neil Howie in the 1973 cult British horror film The Wicker Man, and in the title role of the 1980 Australian biopic Breaker Morant. From 1985 to 1989, Woodward starred as ex-secret agent and private investigator Robert McCall in the American television series The Equalizer, earning him the 1986 Golden Globe Award for Best Television Drama Actor.

Early life
Woodward was born on 1 June 1930 in Croydon, Surrey, the only child of parents Edward Oliver Woodward, a metalworker, and Violet Edith Woodward (née Smith). As a boy, he was bombed out of his home three times during the Blitz. He attended Eccleston Road, Sydenham Road, and E Wallington, as well as Kingston Day Commercial School and Elmwood High School, Hackbridge, all in Surrey. He then attended Kingston College.

Career

Theatre
After leaving school at the age of 15, Woodward wanted to train as a journalist, but took work in a sanitary engineer's office and then at the age of 16 entered the Royal Academy of Dramatic Art (RADA). After the Second World War, he became an associate member of that academy. He was torn between becoming an actor and a professional footballer, and was on the books of Leyton Orient FC and Brentford FC, making three appearances in the football league for the latter, but a serious knee injury kept him out of the game for over a year.

Woodward's professional acting debut was in the Castle Theatre, Farnham, in 1946. After graduation from RADA, he worked extensively in repertory companies as a Shakespearean actor throughout England and Scotland, making his London stage debut in R. F. Delderfield's Where There's a Will in 1955 and also appeared in the film adaptation that same year, his first film, and then Romeo and Juliet and Hamlet (1955). Having established himself, he also worked in Broadway theatre in New York City and in Australia. Woodward first appeared on Broadway in Rattle of a Simple Man (1963) and the musical comedy High Spirits (1964–1965), which won three Tony Awards, followed by the 1966 comedy The Best Laid Plans. In 1970, after Woodward played Sidney Carton in the West End musical Two Cities, based on Dickens's novel, Laurence Olivier invited him to choose his own role in the Royal National Theatre, and he chose Cyrano de Bergerac (1971).

Woodward played Dr. Watson opposite Keith Baxter as Sherlock Holmes in the play Murder Dear Watson in 1983.

In 2004, Woodward, alongside Australian actor Daniel MacPherson, appeared as God in a revival of The Mystery Plays at Canterbury Cathedral. From a cast of hundreds of local actors, Joseph McManners and Thomas James Longley also featured with smaller speaking roles.

Film
He made occasional appearances until taking the role of Police Sergeant Neil Howie in the thriller The Wicker Man in 1973. Woodward was offered a cameo role in the 2005 remake, but declined. He also appeared in the 1982 film Who Dares Wins, also known as The Final Option on the film's release history. as Commander Powell.

Woodward played the title role in the 1980 Australian biographical film drama Breaker Morant, which was highly acclaimed, and his presence brought the film worldwide attention. Woodward also had a supporting role in the 2007 action comedy Hot Fuzz. His last lead film role was that of the Reverend Frederick Densham in A Congregation of Ghosts, the story of an eccentric vicar who is said to have alienated his congregation and preached to cardboard cut-outs. 

Robin Hardy, who directed The Wicker Man, said, "He was one of the greatest actors of his generation, without a doubt, with a broad career on American television, as well as on British film." Noël Coward once said of him, "He was one of the nicest and most co-operative actors I've ever met or worked with."

In 1990, Woodward was the narrator for the official FIFA film of the 1990 World Cup entitled Soccer Shoot-Out.

Television
Woodward appeared in many television productions. In the early 1960s, he was a jobbing actor who made a number of minor TV appearances in supporting roles. His casting as Guy Crouchback in the 1967 adaption of Evelyn Waugh's Sword of Honour trilogy, dramatised by Giles Cooper and directed by Donald McWhinnie, established him as an actor of quality and standing. Crouchback was the central character in Waugh's three novels set against the background of Britain's involvement in World War II. This black-and-white TV dramatisation is now much less well known than a more lavish 2001 colour version with Daniel Craig playing the part of Crouchback. However, the 1967 dramatisation enjoyed a high profile at the time, and it featured several leading actors of that era, including Ronald Fraser, Freddie Jones, Vivian Pickles, Nicholas Courtney, and James Villiers. Moreover, Evelyn Waugh had met and approved Giles Cooper as the scriptwriter, having their schooling at Lancing College in common, albeit more than a decade apart.

In 1967, Woodward played the eventual victim in an episode of The Saint TV series ("The Persistent Patriots"). The same year, he was cast as David Callan in the ITV Armchair Theatre play A Magnum for Schneider, which later became the spy series Callan, one of his early television roles and one in which he demonstrated his ability to express controlled rage. His performance assured the series success from 1967 to 1972, with a film appearing in 1974. He also appeared opposite Laurence Olivier in a 1978 adaptation of Saturday, Sunday, Monday in the Laurence Olivier Presents anthology series.

The success of Callan typecast him somewhat, but the enduring success of the genre allowed him to gain leading roles in similar productions, though none would prove to be as iconic as Callan. In 1977, he starred in two series of the BBC2 dystopian drama 1990, about a future Britain lurching into totalitarianism.

The late 1970s he spent on both stage and film, but he had not found recognition and popularity exceeding that of Callan until he took the lead role in the American television series The Equalizer (1985–89) as a former intelligence operative. After filming a few episodes of the third season, Woodward suffered a massive coronary. For several episodes, additional actors were brought in to reduce the workload on Woodward as he recovered from the condition. The first episode filmed following Woodward's heart attack involved his character being severely injured by a KGB bullet, providing Woodward with a chance to rest over several episodes. Later in the season, Woodward resumed his full duties and carried the show through a fourth season during 1988-1989. During this period, he also starred in the Cold War espionage thriller, Codename: Kyril (1988), as an MI6 double agent.

Subsequently, he starred in the short-lived CBS series Over My Dead Body, which ran in 1990, playing a mystery writer who gets involved in solving real crimes. In 1994 and 1997, Woodward starred in the BBC drama Common As Muck, in which he played a binman called Nev.

In 1993, Woodward appeared in the Welsh language drama, Tan ar y Comin. Versions were made in both English and Welsh, and Woodward appeared in both, being specially coached in the latter since he did not speak a word of the language.

In 1999, Woodward appeared alongside his son Peter in The Long Road, an episode of the Babylon 5 spin-off, Crusade, on which Peter was a regular cast member. While both actors were playing the part of unrelated Technomages, the on-screen chemistry between them was clear.

His career continued with TV guest-star roles, including an appearance in The New Alfred Hitchcock Presents and Mr. Jones (or Philip, codename Flavius) in the series La Femme Nikita. He also guest-starred with his son Tim and grandson Sam as a London gangster family in a special storyline for The Bill in 2008. In March 2009, he joined EastEnders for six episodes, playing Tommy Clifford.

Woodward was a wargamer and hosted a series of programmes for Tyne Tees Television in 1978 about the hobby with fellow enthusiast Peter Gilder, who built and owned the beautiful Gettysburg diorama used for one of the gaming scenes from the 1974 film Callan.

Woodward was the subject of This Is Your Life on two occasions; in February 1971, he was surprised by Eamonn Andrews in the bar of London's White House Hotel, and in February 1995, Michael Aspel surprised him during a photoshoot at Syon House in West London.

Music
His capability as tenor enabled him to record 12 albums of romantic songs, as well as three albums of poetry and 14 books to tape. His vocal ability and acting skill enabled him to make a number of appearances when time allowed on the BBC's Edwardian era music hall programme, The Good Old Days.

Woodward had two top-100 albums in the UK Album Chart; This Man Alone (number 53 in 1970) and The Edward Woodward Album (number 20 in 1972), while the single "The Way You Look Tonight" peaked at number 42 on the UK Singles Chart in 1971. He also had two top 100 albums in Australia; Edwardian Woodward (#97 in 1975) and A Romantic Hour (#92 in 1980)

Selected discography
This Man Alone (1970)
It Had to Be You (1971)
The Edward Woodward Album (1972)
An evening with.... Edward Woodward (1974)
Woodward Again (1974)
Edwardian Woodward (1975)
Love Is the Key (1977)
The Thought of You (1978)
Don't Get Around Much Anymore (1979)

Personal life
Woodward was married twice. His first marriage was to actress Venetia Barrett (born Venetia Mary Collett, 1928-2016) from 1952 to 1986. They had two sons: Tim Woodward (born 1953) and Peter Woodward (born 1956), both of whom became actors, as well as a daughter, the Tony Award-nominated actress Sarah Woodward (born 1963). Woodward left Barrett for actress Michele Dotrice, the daughter of his contemporary Roy Dotrice, and married her in New York City in January 1987. Their daughter, Emily Beth Woodward (born 1983), was present at the ceremony.

Woodward was in Cyprus during the Turkish invasion of the island in 1974. Staying in the northern Cyprus town of Kyrenia, he was one of several Britons evacuated from the island by the Royal Navy aircraft carrier, HMS Hermes following the Turkish invasion and occupation of Kyrenia.

Woodward was a prominent endorser of the Labour Party in the 1970 general election, featuring in publicity material. Later, he announced support for the SDP.

Woodward suffered a massive heart attack in 1987 (during the third season of The Equalizer) and another one in 1994. He underwent triple bypass surgery in 1996 and quit smoking. In 2003, he was diagnosed with prostate cancer. In July 2009, a planned performance of Love Letters, co-starring his wife Michele, was to be postponed because of damage caused to his hip when he fell down the stairs at his West Country home.

Death 
Woodward died at the Royal Cornwall Hospital in Truro, Cornwall, on 16 November 2009, at the age of 79, near his home at Hawker's Cove. He was buried at Padstow Cemetery and was survived by his wife, their daughter, and three children from his first marriage.

Awards
Woodward won the 1970 BAFTA Award for Best Actor for his title role in Callan. He was made an Officer of the Order of the British Empire (OBE) in 1978. At the 1987 Golden Globe Awards, he won Best Actor in a Dramatic TV Series for his role of Robert McCall in The Equalizer. At the Emmy Awards from 1986 to 1990, he was nominated each year for The Equalizer.

Golden Globe Award for Best Actor – Television Series Drama - 1987
British Academy Television Award for Best Actor - 1970
RTS Television Actor of the Year - 1969, 1970
Primetime Emmy Award for Outstanding Lead Actor in a Drama Series (nominated) - 1986, 1987, 1988, 1989, 1990
Primetime Emmy Award for Outstanding Guest Actor in a Drama Series (nominated) - 1989
Officer of the Most Excellent Order of the British Empire - 1978

Stage work

1955: Where There's a Will
1958: Romeo and Juliet
1958: Hamlet
1962: Rattle of a Simple Man
1964: High Spirits
1968: Two Cities
1969: Julius Caesar
1971: Cyrano de Bergerac
1971: The White Devil
1973: The Wolf
1975: Male of the Species
1976: On Approval
1978: The Dark Horse
1980: The Beggar's Opera (also as director)
1980: Private Lives
1982: The Assassin
1982: Richard III
1992: The Dead Secret

Filmography

Film

Television

References

External links

The Museum of Broadcast Communications 
The Washington Post - 17 November 2009: "Edward Woodward: British leading man personified 'the actor's life'"

1930 births
2009 deaths
British people of English descent
20th-century English male actors
20th-century English singers
21st-century English male actors
Alumni of Kingston College (England)
Alumni of RADA
Best Actor BAFTA Award (television) winners
Best Drama Actor Golden Globe (television) winners
English male Shakespearean actors
English male film actors
English male singers
English male stage actors
English male television actors
Male actors from London
Officers of the Order of the British Empire
People from Croydon
20th-century British male singers